Kartavya (English: Duty) is a 1995 Indian action film directed by Raj Kanwar, starring Sanjay Kapoor and Juhi Chawla. Divya Bharti was chosen as the female lead, she completed some 30 percent of the movie, but due to her sudden death she was replaced by Juhi. Rediff.com found the film "embarrassing".

Synopsis
Karan and Kajal are in love and ready to settle down and lead a happy life. But tragedy strikes as Karan's mother has a heart attack and before she dies, Karan discovers that she wasn't his real mother. He is told that his actual mother is an heiress, Gayatri Singh, who lives in Sundernagar. Karan sets out for Sundernagar to confront her and on reaching there, discovers the tragic story of his mother's life. Her stepbrother, Ugranarayan Singh had killed her husband and had her confined in a mental asylum so that he can inherit all the wealth. Karan must now punish the people responsible for his mother's morbid state.

Cast
 Sanjay Kapoor - Karan Varma (actually Gayatri Devi's son, brought up by Sharada Varma)
 Moushumi Chatterjee - Sharada Varma, Karan's foster mother
 Aruna Irani - Gayatri Devi Singh, Karan's real mother
 Raj Kiran - Suraj Singh (Karan's late father and Gayatri's husband; special cameo appearance)
 Juhi Chawla - Kajal Sahay (Karan's love interest and Ramakant Sahay's daughter)
 Saeed Jaffrey - Ramakant Sahay (Kajal's father)
 Jagdeep - P.K. Dhoot (Kajal's maternal uncle, thus brother-in-law of Ramakant)
 Amrish Puri - Thakur Ugranarayan Singh (Gayatri's evil step-brother, who kept her in a mental asylum for 22 years)
 Asha Sachdev - Roop Sundari (Ugranarayan's wife)
 Mohnish Bahl - Balbir (Ugranarayan's son)
 Ashwin Kaushal - Bhanu (Ugranarayan's son)
 Om Puri - Ghulam Rasul
 Gulshan Grover - Inspector Tribhuvan
 Pramod Moutho - Mayor
 Aasif Sheikh - Vicky (Mayor's son)
 Alok Nath - Doctor Neelkanth

Music

Divya Bharti's death
Divya Bharti was scheduled to play the role of Kaajal, but due to her sudden death in April 1993, she was replaced by Juhi Chawla. Divya Bharti had done 30% of the shooting. Some images of Bharti which were taken during the shoot are available on the Web. Shahrukh Khan was supposed to play the hero opposite Divya Bharti but rejected it. Dimple Kapadia has also signed the film to play the role of the mother, but she later refused due to Divya's Death. She had signed the role considering Divya as female lead, but after her death, Chawla was signed and Kapadia refused to play her mother-in-law, due to their (inadequate) age difference.

References

External links

Indian action films
1995 action films
1995 films
1990s Hindi-language films
Films scored by Dilip Sen-Sameer Sen
Films directed by Raj Kanwar